Na Thom is a district (amphoe) of Nakhon Phanom province, northeastern Thailand.

Geography
Neighboring districts are (from the east clockwise): Ban Phaeng and Si Songkhram of Nakhon Phanom Province; Akat Amnuai of Sakon Nakhon province; and Seka and Bueng Khong Long of Nong Khai province.

History
The minor district (king amphoe) Na Thom was established on 1 April 1992, when three tambons were split off from Ban Phaeng district. It was upgraded to a full district on 11 October 1997.

Administration
The district is divided into three sub-districts (tambons), which are further subdivided into 35 villages (mubans). There are no municipal (thesabans), and three tambon administrative organizations (TAO).

References

External links
amphoe.com
Na Thom Elephant Bin

Na Thom